Chaka K. Daley (born April 9, 1974) is a Canadian soccer coach and former professional player. He is the head coach of the Michigan Wolverines men's soccer team.

Club career
On June 14, 1999, Daley was signed by the New England Revolution from the Boston Bulldogs of the USL A-League. He made two appearances for the team.

References

External links
 
Profile at Providence College
Profile at University of Michigan

1974 births
Living people
Black Canadian soccer players
Boston Bulldogs (soccer) players
Canadian expatriate sportspeople in the United States
Canadian expatriate soccer players
Canadian soccer coaches
Canadian soccer players
Expatriate soccer players in the United States
Association football defenders
Association football forwards
Major League Soccer players
New England Revolution players
Soccer players from Toronto
Providence Friars men's soccer coaches
Providence Friars men's soccer players
Rhode Island Stingrays players
A-League (1995–2004) players
Columbus Crew non-playing staff
Michigan Wolverines men's soccer coaches